Battle of Kehl may refer to:
Battle of Kehl (1796)
Second Battle of Kehl (1796)